Adam Mickiewicz High School in Poznań (VIII Liceum Ogólnokształcące im. Adama Mickiewicza w Poznaniu) is a high school in Poznań, Poland founded by the priest and patriot Czesław Piotrowski in 1923  and named after the poet and patriot Adam Mickiewicz.

Some notable alumni include Anna Jantar, Ryszard Grobelny, Maria Pasło-Wiśniewska and Marcin Libicki. The most notable teacher was until recently the poet and writer Bogusława Latawiec.

Due to huge financial demands for general refit, Poznań's city authorities are considering the possibility of finding a new place for a school and building a modern edifice.

References

External links
 Czesław Piotrowski
 Bogusława Latawiec
 Official school page

High schools in Poland
Education in Poznań
Educational institutions established in 1923
1923 establishments in Poland